Colin "Kid Coalminer" Wilson is an Australian heavyweight boxer who held the Australian heavyweight boxing title 17 February 1997 – 31 January 1998, 19 September 2003 – 2 November 2007, and 3 October 2009 – 20 August 2010, losing the last to 39-year-old Justin Whitehead. Wilson debuted against Jason Coaker on 13 November 1992, winning by knockout, his first of more than 20 such wins.

See also 
 List of Australian heavyweight boxing champions

References 

1972 births
Living people
Australian male boxers
Heavyweight boxers